Ashtabhuji Temple is a Hindu Shaivist temple located in Adbhar, Janjgir-Champa district, Chhattisgarh, India.

References 

Hindu temples in Chhattisgarh
Durga temples
7th-century Hindu temples